Gottfried Strasser (12 March 1854 – 9 April 1912) was a Swiss Protestant pastor, poet, and writer.

References

External links
 

1854 births
1912 deaths
Swiss Calvinist and Reformed ministers
19th-century Calvinist and Reformed ministers
20th-century Calvinist and Reformed ministers
19th-century Swiss poets
20th-century Swiss poets
People from the canton of Bern
University of Bern alumni
Swiss male writers
Swiss writers in German